Wachtendonk at the confluence of Niers River and Nette River is a municipality in the district of Kleve in North Rhine-Westphalia, Germany. It is located west of the Rhine half way between Duisburg and Venlo at the Dutch border. Its name means 'bailiff's Donk'.

Gallery

References

External links
  

Kleve (district)